The Canon EF-S lens mount is a derivative of the EF lens mount created for a subset of Canon digital single-lens reflex cameras with APS-C sized image sensors. It was released in 2003. Cameras with the EF-S mount are backward compatible with the EF lenses and, as such, have a flange focal distance of 44.0 mm. Such cameras, however, have more clearance, allowing lens elements to be closer to the sensor than in the EF mount. Only Canon cameras released after 2003 with APS-C sized sensors support the EF-S mount.

The "S" in EF-S has variously been described by Canon as coming from either "Small image circle" (the lens projects a smaller image circle than normal EF lenses to match the sensor), or "Short back focus" (the smaller mirror used in APS-C cameras also allows optical elements to protrude further into the camera body, reducing the minimum distance between the sensor and the back element of the lens). The combination of a smaller sensor and shorter back focal length distance enhances the possibilities for wide angle and very wide angle lenses. Such lenses designed for the EF-S mount can be made smaller, lighter (containing less glass), faster (larger aperture) and less expensive. 

Although not all Canon EF-S lenses use this short back focal length, they cannot be mounted on DSLRs with sensors larger than APS-C. However, some lenses produced by third-party manufacturers may feature the standard EF mount if they do not have the shorter back focal length but only have a small image circle. Such lenses will give noticeable vignetting or unsharp outer areas if used on a 35mm film or full frame sensor cameras. To a lesser degree, vignetting also occurs with APS-H sensor sizes, such as several (now discontinued) cameras of the 1D series.

Compatibility
The cameras that can use the EF-S mount are:

 EOS 7D
 EOS 7D Mark II
 EOS 20D
 EOS 20Da
 EOS 30D
 EOS 40D
 EOS 50D
 EOS 60D
 EOS 60Da
 EOS 70D
 EOS 77D
 EOS 80D
 EOS 90D
 EOS 100D/Rebel SL1
 EOS 200D/Rebel SL2
 EOS 250D/Rebel SL3
 EOS 300D/Digital Rebel
 EOS 350D/Digital Rebel XT
 EOS 400D/Digital Rebel XTi
 EOS 450D/Rebel XSi
 EOS 500D/Rebel T1i
 EOS 550D/Rebel T2i
 EOS 600D/Rebel T3i
 EOS 650D/Rebel T4i
 EOS 700D/Rebel T5i
 EOS 750D/Rebel T6i
 EOS 760D/Rebel T6s
 EOS 800D/Rebel T7i
 EOS 850D/Rebel T8i
 EOS 1000D/Rebel XS
 EOS 1100D/Rebel T3
 EOS 1200D/Rebel T5
 EOS 1300D/Rebel T6
 EOS 2000D/Rebel T7
 EOS 4000D/Rebel T100
 Canon EOS C100
 Canon EOS C200
 Canon EOS C300
 Canon EOS C500
 Blackmagic Pocket Cinema Camera 6K

By design, it is physically impossible to mount EF-S lenses on EF-only cameras. This is because the increased proximity of the lens to the sensor means that on full-frame sensor or 35mm film EF cameras the lens itself would obstruct the mirror's movement and cause damage to the lens and/or camera. While it is possible to modify the lens such that the physical obstruction is removed, allowing for mounting to EF mount cameras, the rear of the lens would still obstruct the mirror. An additional reason is that the lenses produce a smaller image circle of even illumination (circle of no vignetting). An EF-S lens alignment mark is indicated by a small white rectangle, whereas the EF employs a small red dot. The lens will insert into the body when the alignment marks on each are matched, and the lens can then be rotated and locked into the operating position. EF-S camera bodies have both EF-S and EF alignment marks, while EF bodies have only EF marks. Some have reported success attaching EF-S lenses to full-frame bodies with the use of an extension tube; however, this does not eliminate the vignetting problem, and also removes the lens's ability to achieve infinity focus. Also, attachment of EF-S lenses on EF bodies can often be accomplished by removing the small plastic ring seen in the photo above. Although vignetting is still an issue, photos can be taken, and infinity focus achieved. This modification comes with caveats, one being that on some lenses, like the EF-S 10-22mm, at the 10mm setting, the element protrudes too far back toward EF mount camera bodies. 

The 10D, D60, D30, and earlier cameras share the EF-only mount with the full frame EOS camera bodies, and also with the APS-H size EOS camera bodies (1D series prior to the 1D X), despite having a smaller sensor and therefore a smaller mirror.

List of EF-S lenses

The EF-S lens mount is a relatively new offering from Canon, so the selection of available lenses is limited compared to the full EF range, but it is backward compatible with the EF mount, and can therefore still accept all EF lenses. The variety of EF-S prime lenses is very limited in comparison to EF-S zoom lenses, with three primes to nine zooms. EF-S lenses are very popular due to their lower cost and zoom lenses are preferred by amateur photographers.  no EF-S lens has been produced with the "L" designation or with diffractive optics, and only three EF-S prime lenses have been produced.

References

External links
List of all Canon EF and EF-S lenses with technical specifications
EF lenses at the Canon Camera Museum
EF Lens Lineup at Canon USA
EF/EF-S lens chart, seems now defunct
EF-S lenses compatible with EOS-10D

 
Lens mounts

de:EF-Bajonett#EF-S-Bajonett